Cluedo is a British game show based on the board game of the same name. Each week, a reenactment of the murder at the stately home Arlington Grange of a visiting guest was played and, through a combination of interrogating the suspects (of whom only the murderer could lie) and deduction, celebrity guests had to discover who committed the murder, which of six weapons (not usually the original six from the board game) and in which room it was committed, whilst viewers were invited to play along at home.

Production
The TV show essentially followed in the footsteps of an earlier detective fiction program named Whodunnit?, where audience members had to guess the identity of the culprit after viewing prerecorded footage and interrogating suspects. The Doctors Who's Who describes Whodunnit? as a celebrity quiz show "not unlike Cluedo...where the panel would see some visual clues and a piece of film and decide who killed whom and in what capacity". Dalek I Loved You described Whodunnit? as "an earlier version of Cluedo".

David McCallum, who played Professor Plum in series 2, said "This is not the Royal Shakespeare Company but it still requires technique. It's not overacting and it's not underacting. it's just slightly over the top". Series three's Colonel Mustard Lewis Collins said in an interview with This Morning: "Cluedo is the most nerve-racking thing I've ever done...", despite one magazine saying he was "tailor-made" for the role. Lysette Anthony, who played Miss Scarlett in series 3, said "Cluedo is fun to play because it's camp and it's the complete opposite of what I'm about".

Leslie Grantham, series four's Colonel Mustard, said "I'm the last person you'd expect to play [him]. That's why I was so flattered to be offered the role", and added that "Cluedo is great fun to do. It's fascinating to watch these asexual, inanimate characters brought to life". Despite the notion that the Colonel's prior occupation would make him the obvious suspect for every murder, it is stressed that "everyone has equally good reasons for bumping off the victim". Joan Sims, who played Mrs White in the 1990 Christmas special, would reprise her role in the 1995 Cluedo CD-I game.

Brindebella's British analogue Arlington Grange, filed at Arley Hall in Cheshire, was chosen as it had a "near perfect layout of downstairs rooms" that the game of Cluedo requires. Built in 1744, Arley Hall was privately owned and had become a major tourist attraction since it was opened to the public in 1962. Producer Mark Gorton explained, "the floorplan lends itself to the boardgame very well and that was a major consideration when choosing the location". The Cheshire mansion was only 18 miles from the Grenada studios in Manchester where the live portions were taped, and open the public only at certain times of the year, both of which made filming easier. The house had to be furnished to fit the 1930s period that the show is set in, while some original furniture was deemed "ideal for the programme"; Gorton noted, ”as far as the owners were concerned, as long as the items weren’t too valuable we were free to use them.”

A Billiard Room had to be constructed as Arlington lacked one, which was created in a front drawing room with props including a billiard table, scoring devices, and cues. A huge table was added to the Dining Room with a series of gothic high-backed chairs; Gorton noted, “we also added a variety of strange stuffed animals to lend to it a kind of Addams Family feel". In contrast, the Library needed little attention to appear on screen, while the Study needed little alteration besides triptychs and a Bakelite telephone. In later series the Kitchen was a mock-up created in a spare room, as the real kitchen was in use for visitors to Arley Hall and production decided it "felt...too modern for us". The props team brought in an Aga, refrigerator, pine table, a rack of pheasants, and sharp kitchen implements. The Drawing Room "fitted the bill perfectly" due to its "unusual gothic fireplaces" which featured leaping gargoyles and furnishings like oil paintings, however high-backed furniture with lions paw feet was added.

Format
Each episode starts with the host introducing the 6 possible weapons that change with each episode, and the same suspects and rooms. Then a prerecorded scenario plays out which culminates in the murder of a guest at Arlington Grange. This is followed by the studio sleuths cross-examining the characters to uncover further information. When one team succeeds, a spotlight shines on the culprit as they explain how and why they committed the crime. Obviously, despite the episode ending with one of the suspects confessing to murder, all six would return in the next episode as if nothing had happened.

Cast

Episodes

Original series

Specials

Critical reception
Understanding the Global TV Format likened the show to Voce Decide, describing them both as "a hybrid, an amalgamation of a gameshow with a fictional situation and story". Similarly, The A to Z of Australian Radio and Television deemed the Australian version a "hybrid gameshow/whodunnit". One magazine said the show "promise[s] to keep us guessing till the very end". One magazine noted the difficulties involved in giving life to a one-dimensional character "when the only source material they have to work on comes out of a small cardboard box". One magazine noted the "high level of talent the show can attract", putting it down to Cluedo being a game that most households (including those of celebrities) grew up with. Cluedo fansite Cluedofan deemed it "an absolutely brilliant TV gameshow".

On his stint as host, Chris Tarrant was later quoted as saying, "I absolutely hated hosting Cluedo; it's the worst thing I've ever done. It took forever to make the thing. We used to have to turn the studio audience over just to make sure they didn't get any bed sores."

Controversy
In the second episode of the fourth season, Col. Mike Mustard murdered former comrade and property developer Sir Nigel Hussey (Ian McNeice) with a G-string in the kitchen. A short time after the episode aired, the producers received a letter that was written by the family of one Felix Reese, who himself was a taxi driver who was shot in the head by Leslie Grantham (the actor playing Col. Mustard) while the future star of EastEnders was a soldier stationed in Germany. The Reeses found it distasteful that someone who performed an illegal killing as a soldier would be cast as someone who performed an illegal killing as a soldier. Matthew Wright from The Sun asked Grantham about the "irony" of this turn at a press conference, which angered the actor.

International versions

Australia

Germany

France

Italy

Portugal 
The Portuguese version lasted for one season in 1995 consisting of 13 episodes. The show was hosted by Rogério Samora. It premiered on March 26, 1995. It was produced by Cinemate, D&D Audiovisuais, and Televisão Independente (TVI). The show is reported an "very interesting novelty, despite having gone unnoticed." It has been deemed an "innovative contest".

Sweden

References

External links

Cluedo at BFI

 Press clippings for the German Cluedo Das Mörderspiel TV series
 Review of German series (in German)
 Interview with series writer Kevin K. Rattan

1990 British television series debuts
1993 British television series endings
1990s British game shows
English-language television shows
ITV panel games
Television shows produced by Granada Television
Television series by ITV Studios
1990s British mystery television series
Cluedo
Television shows based on board games